The 1949 Belgian Grand Prix was a Grand Prix motor race which was held at Spa-Francorchamps on 19 June 1949. The race was won by Louis Rosier driving a Talbot-Lago T26C.

Entries

Classification

Race

References

Belgian Grand Prix
Belgian
Grand Prix
Belgian Grand Prix